Clemente Marcelino Valencia Nájera (17 July 1968 – 11 October 2011) was a Mexican luchador enmascarado, or masked professional wrestler, better known by the ring name Doctor X, under which he worked for the Mexican professional wrestling promotion Consejo Mundial de Lucha Libre (CMLL) for most of his career, winning the Mexican National Welterweight Championship and the Mexican National Trios Championship, teaming with Sangre Azteca and Nitro. Doctor X was a member of Pandilla Guerreras and the co-leader of Los Guerreros Tuareg. In August 2011, Valencia quit CMLL and joined Perros del Mal Producciones under the new ring name Doctor X-Treme. Valencia also previously worked as "Dr. O'Borman Jr." a name he licensed from the original Dr. O'Borman. Throughout his career, Doctor X's real name was not a matter of public record, as is often the case with masked wrestlers in Mexico where their private lives are kept a secret from the wrestling fans. He was killed on 11 October 2011 when trying to break up a fight.

Professional wrestling career

Consejo Mundial de Lucha Libre
Valencia began his wrestling career in 1995 after training under Rafael Salamanca, La Cobra and Scorpio (Sr.), he would later receive additional training from Memo Díaz and El Satánico. Initially he worked as Dr. O'Borman Jr., paying the original Dr. O'Borman for the use of the name. By the end of the 1999s he began working regularly for Consejo Mundial de Lucha Libre (CMLL). By 2000 problems with who had the right to the name "Dr. O'Borman Jr." arose, forcing him to give up the name. Together with CMLL owner Paco Alonso they came up with the concept of "Doctor X", an "evil doctor" in the vein of Dr. Wagner Jr., wearing all white with a big "X" on his mask. Later on the masks and outfits would become increasingly colorful. Doctor X's first real chance to prove himself came in 2001 where he participated in that year's Gran Alternativa tournament. He teamed with Gran Markus Jr., but lost to eventual tournament winners Olímpico and Sicodelico Jr. in the first round. Over the next couple of years Doctor X kept working low card matches, slowly establishing a name for himself. In early 2003 Doctor X began a storyline feud with Tigre Blanco, the reigning Mexican National Welterweight Champion at the time. On 11 March 2003, Doctor X defeated Tigre Blanco to win the championship, a title he would hold for over two years. In 2004 he once again competed in the Gran Alternativa, teaming with Último Guerrero. The team defeated Último Dragón and Neutron in the first round and Shocker and Alan Stone in the second round before losing to El Hijo del Santo and Místico in the finals.

Pandilla Guerrera
In early 2005 the wrestling group Los Guerreros del Infierno created an affiliated group of low to mid-carders called Pandilla Guerrera (Spanish for "Gang of Warriors") that included Doctor X, Nitro, Sangre Azteca, Hooligan and several others. On 25 March 2005 Doctor X teamed up with fellow Pandilla Guerrera members Sangre Azteca and Nitro to defeat El Felino, Safari and Volador Jr. to win the Mexican National Trios Championship. For two months Doctor X was a double champion until he lost the Mexican National Welterweight Championship to La Máscara on 13 May 2005. Guerrero Pandilla's Trios title reign lasted 196 days before they lost to Máximo, El Sagrado and El Texano Jr. After making it to the finals of the 2005 Gran Alternativa he teamed with Universo 2000 for the 2005 Gran Alternativa. In the first round the team defeated Bronco and El Texano Jr. before losing to eventual winners Dr. Wagner. Jr. and Misterioso Jr. in the semi-final.

Guerreros Tuareg
In 2007 most members of Pandilla Guerrera broke away from Los Guerreros del Infierno, wanting to break out of their shadow and move up the rankings themselves. Doctor X, Arkangel de la Muerte, Nitro, Skándalo, Hooligan and Loco Max formed a group originally known as Rebeldes del Desierto (Rebels of the desert) but later on would become generally known as Los Guerreros Tuareg (Tuareg Warriors), or Rebeldes Tuareg. Despite objections from Los Guerreros del Infierno that the name was too close to theirs, Guerreros Tuareg is the name that has stuck for the group. Doctor X became the interim co-leader of Guerreros Tuareg along with Arkangel when Nitro suffered a serious injury in early 2009. Since forming Guerreros Tuareg Doctor X has not worked regularly in Arena Mexico, CMLL's main arena, something which he himself has expressed his unhappiness with. He has publicly stated that he feels passed over for wrestlers with "1/10" his talent. On 18 October 2009 Doctor X was one of 12 wrestlers who put his mask on the line in a 12-man Luchas de Apuestas cage match. He was the fifth person to escape the cage keeping his mask safe, the final saw Pólvora pin Tigre Blanco to unmask him. In April 2010, Doctor X began a feud with Fabián el Gitano, a feud that saw both wrestlers intentionally disqualified several times as they tore each other's masks off. During the 12-man steel cage match in the main event of the 2010 Infierno en el Ring Doctor X primarily targeted his rival Fabián el Gitano, but when it came down to it in the end he decided to leave the cage instead of trying to unmask Fabián. In the end Ángel de Oro defeated Fabián el Gitano in the Lucha de Apuesta (bet match) portion of the match instead, unmasking him. Dr.X took then part to a 12-man cage match on Christmas day of 2010 in Arena Neza including both CMLL and independent luchadores, winning the mask of Hermano Muerte III. On 4 August 2011, it was reported that Doctor X had quit CMLL.

Perros del Mal Producciones
On 6 August 2011, Doctor X announced that he would joining independent promotion Perros del Mal Producciones under the new ring name Doctor X-Treme. He wrestled his first match for the promotion later that same day.

Death
On October 11, 2011, Valencia was shot in the head and killed when he tried to break up a fight while attending a religious party in Santa María Aztahuacán, Iztapalapa, Mexico City. He was survived by a wife and two children under the age of ten.

Championships and accomplishments
Consejo Mundial de Lucha Libre
Mexican National Welterweight Championship (1 time)
Mexican National Trios Championship (1 time) – with Sangre Azteca and Nitro as Pandilla Guerrera

See also
 List of premature professional wrestling deaths

References

1968 births
2011 deaths
Mexican male professional wrestlers
Deaths by firearm in Mexico
Male murder victims
Mexican murder victims
Masked wrestlers
Professional wrestlers from Mexico City
20th-century professional wrestlers
Mexican National Trios Champions
Mexican National Welterweight Champions